Shonali Bhowmik (born 20th century) is an American musician, actress, screenwriter, and producer.  She also was one of the hosts of the Upright Citizens Brigade show Variety SHAC. She has performed in the bands Tigers and Monkeys, and Ultrababyfat.

Early life
Bhowmik grew up in Nashville, Tennessee. She has a sister named Ruchi Bhowmik, and her parents are named Dilip Bhowmik and Shuba Bhowmik. She attended law school in Atlanta, Georgia.

Career

Ultrababyfat
She began Ultrababyfat with her best friend, Michelle Dubois, as they had been playing music since they were children.  David Cross discovered Ultrababyfat in Atlanta.  Bhowmik then toured with Cross while filming his Let America Laugh DVD.

Tigers and Monkeys
Dmitri Martin helped Bhowmik come up with the name for the band by asking her what her two favorite animals were.  Bhowmik did not want to use her name to promote the show for a band consisting of three people from Florida.

Variety SHAC
Bhowmik hosted Variety SHAC throughout its entirety and was the "S" for the acronym SHAC.  Shonali toured with Cross where she got her connection to the Upright Citizens Brigade where Variety SHAC held its shows for many years. Variety SHAC was given money to create a television pilot by IFC. Bhowmik also co-starred in the Variety SHAC videos which were completed annually.  The members of Variety SHAC have been considered as some of the funniest women in comedy at the time of their show.

Discography

Ultrababyfat
Eight Balls in Reverse (2001)

Tigers and Monkeys
Loose Mouth (2007)
The Animals Will Forgive Us Again (2014)

Solo releases
 100 Oaks Revival (2011)

Filmography 
 Sardines Out of a Can (2013)

See also

 List of people from Nashville, Tennessee

References

External links
 , her official website
 

Year of birth missing (living people)
20th-century births
21st-century American actresses
Actresses from Nashville, Tennessee
American women musicians of Indian descent
American women rock singers
American rock guitarists
Living people
Singers from Nashville, Tennessee
21st-century American women guitarists
21st-century American guitarists
Guitarists from Tennessee
20th-century American women guitarists
20th-century American guitarists
20th-century American women singers
21st-century American women singers
20th-century American singers